Karim Mostafa is a Sweden-born photographer working in and around Beirut since 2011, working mainly with journalism and documentary photography. He works on projects and reports documenting social, political and development-related issues in the Middle East, Asia and Central America.

During 2011 and 2012, Karim Mostafa photographed the revolution in Egypt one year later, he was in Libya to document life one year after the anti-Gaddafi uprising. He has documented the situation for sex workers and drug users in Bangladesh, migrants being deported back to Honduras and Guatemala, the Syrian refugee community living in Lebanon and Algeria. He has photographed the first female pastor in the Middle East, hashish-growing families in the Lebanese mountains and people living in the deadliest city in the world.

Karim Mostafa's photographs have been published in international publications including  Foreign Policy, The Guardian, Al Jazeera and VICE, as well as India's The Caravan, Norway's Aftenposten and many Swedish publications, including SvD, Fokus, Hemslöjd, OmVärlden and Vi Läser.

Personal life
He grow up in Falköping, Sweden.

Exhibitions and awards

Selected exhibitions
 Galleri Kontrast Fotosidan Masters, Stockholm, 2014

Scholarships
Received scholarships from Swedish Union of Journalists to participateat Foundry Photojournalism Workshop in Guatemala 2014.

References

Asia is a trawling for a deadly fishing war
 Rotten state. Lebanon
 The Guardian
 Verdens farligste

External links
 Official website
 Annual report 2014

Living people
Swedish photographers
People from Falköping Municipality
Year of birth missing (living people)